The Spessart Inn is a 1958 West German musical comedy film directed by Kurt Hoffmann. It starred Liselotte Pulver and Carlos Thompson.

Plot
In the late years of the 18th century, Felix and Peter, two journeymen, are travelling across the Spessart hills to Würzburg. Scared of the bandits that plague these parts, especially after a brief encounter with them, the two are glad to find an inn in the middle of the forest. However, it turns out that they have wandered into a den of thieves. The owners are in league with the bandits, who this very night plan to abduct Franziska, the Comtesse von Sandau, who is travelling through the forest with a group including her fiancé, Baron Sperling. Their coach is waylaid by a trap and the bandits direct them to the nearby inn. The waitress warns the journeymen of impending danger and they pass on the warning to the nobles. During the night, the brigands arrive. To escape, the Comtesse switches places with Felix and, in a man's clothes, escapes with Peter. Felix (as Comtesse), Franziska's maid and the pastor are taken to the bandits' lair. The bandits send Baron Sperling on his way to carry the demand for 20,000 Gulden to Graf Sandau, Franziska's father.

When Franziska arrives at her father's castle, he refuses to pay the ransom for the commoner who has taken his daughter's place. Instead, Graf Sandau decides to send the military against the bandits. Franziska thus rides to the bandits' lair and pretends to be a highwayman herself. The bandit leader accepts her as a henchman, but makes her sleep in his hut. In the morning he discovers her true identity but keeps this information from his men.

When Graf Sandau finds out that the Comtesse has gone to the bandits he sends Baron Sperling to the inn with the ransom money. The soldiers shadow him but the plan to follow the bandits back to their lair fails. Meanwhile, at the bandits' lair, their corporal finds out that the "Comtesse" they have imprisoned is a man. Franziska, on the pretense that she wants to find out the truth about the prisoner, switches back places with Felix, which saves his life but makes her a prisoner. The corporal wants to kill her and a confrontation ensues. The leader sides with the prisoners and during the fight, the parson escapes. The soldiers find the bandits' lair, but the leader snatches the Comtesse and rides off.

Franziska conceals the bandit leader in her father's castle. He reveals to her that he is in fact the son of an Italian Count from whom Graf Sandau borrowed money in the past, which he never repaid. After his father's death he came to Germany to regain his money from Graf Sandau, but before he could do so he was taken prisoner by the bandits. They forced him to join their band and eventually he became their leader. The planned abduction of the Comtesse was intended to make Graf Sandau finally pay the money he owed.

The soldiers search the castle and the bandit leader flees. However, he returns and elopes with Franziska who was about to marry Baron Sperling—a purely financial match set up by her father. The bandit leader/count takes Franziska in lieu of the money he is owed and they drive off in a wagon.

Cast

 Liselotte Pulver as Comtesse Franziska von Sandau
 Carlos Thompson as Bandit Captain
 Günther Lüders as Baron Eberhard Sperling
 Rudolf Vogel as Parucchio
 Wolfgang Neuss as Knoll
 Wolfgang Müller as Funzel
 Ina Peters as Maid Barbara
 Kai Fischer as Bettina
 Veronika Fitz as Louise
 Herbert Hübner as Graf Sandau
 Hubert von Meyerinck as Obrist von Teckel
 Helmut Lohner as Felix
 Hans Clarin as Peter
 Paul Esser as Bandit Corporal
 Otto Storr as Parson
 Karl Hanft as Jacob
 Heini Göbel as Coachman Gottlieb
 Ernst Brasch as Servant Anton
 Vera Complojer as Landlady
 Anette Karmann as Kitchen Maid Adele
 Georg Lehn as Stadtbote
 Ralf Wolter as Bandit

Production
The script was based on an 1826 novella by Wilhelm Hauff and written by Heinz Pauck and Luiselotte Enderle. Curt Hanno Gutbrod also worked on the script. An earlier film version of Hauff's story had been released in 1923, directed by Adolf Wenter and starring Friedrich Berger and Ellen Kürty.

The film was shot at the Bavaria Studios in Munich with sets designed by the art directors Robert Herlth and Kurt Herlth. Schloss Mespelbrunn, actually located within the Spessart hills, was used as the castle of Graf Sandau. Another location was the market square of Miltenberg, a town between the Spessart and the Odenwald.

Release
The Spessart Inn premiered on 15 January 1958 at the Gloria-Palast in Berlin.

The film was entered into the 1958 Cannes Film Festival and nominated for the Palme d'Or.

Kurt Hoffmann's The Haunted Castle and Glorious Times at the Spessart Inn were sequels of a sort to this film.

Reception
The Filmbewertungsstelle awarded the film Prädikat: Wertvoll. It also received the Ernst-Lubitsch-Award in 1958. In 1960 it was awarded a "Bambi" for "Artistically Best Film of the Year" and in 1961 the Preis der deutschen Filmkritik for "Best Film".

Liselotte Pulver received the Filmband in Silber for "Best Actress" at the Deutscher Filmpreis in 1958 for her role as Franziska.

The Lexikon des internationalen Films calls the film "a colourful, delightfully spooky and cheerful film with a parodistic touch".

More recently, theatres in several towns in Germany, including Mespelbrunn, Fulda or Donauwörth have staged plays/musicals that were based on the film or at least included some of the elements it had added to Hauff's original story.

Further reading
 Wilhelm Hauff: The Caravan. The Sheik of Alexandria and his Slaves. The Inn in the Spessart (Classic Reprint). Forgotten Books, 2010. . 
 Klaus Rosenthal: Das Wirtshaus im Spessart. Ein deutsches Film-Musical (German). Schlossallee-Verlag, Mespelbrunn 1998. (self-published)

References

External links
 

1958 films
1958 musical comedy films
1950s adventure comedy films
1950s historical comedy films
1950s historical musical films
German historical comedy films
German musical comedy films
German adventure comedy films
German historical musical films
West German films
1950s German-language films
Films directed by Kurt Hoffmann
Films based on works by Wilhelm Hauff
Films set in the 18th century
Films set in forests
Cross-dressing in film
Constantin Film films
Films shot at Bavaria Studios
Spessart
1950s German films